The Legislative Assembly of the Jewish Autonomous Oblast is the regional parliament of the Jewish Autonomous Oblast, a federal subject of Russia. A total of 19 deputies are elected for five-year terms.

Elections

2021

List of chairpersons 
 Stanislav Vavilov — 1994 to 2001
 Anatoly Tikhomirov — 2001 to 2016
  — 2016 to 2021
  — 2021 to present

References

Jewish Autonomous Oblast
Unicameral legislatures
Politics of the Jewish Autonomous Oblast